Billie Ray Worley is an American film and television actor.  He played Patrick Quinn on the U.S. TV show Early Edition.

Filmography
Movies
Hear No Evil (1993)
I Love Trouble (1994)
Strange Days (1995)
I Woke Up Early the Day I Died (1998)
How to Make the Cruelest Month (1998)
Space Cowboys (2000)
Bad Meat (2004)
Daylight Fades (2009)
Tennessee Queer (2012)
TV Movies
Tad (1995)
Piranha (1995)
Weapons of Mass Distraction (1997)
The Pentagon Wars (1998)
How to Make the Cruelest Month (1998)
Movies That Went Straight To Video
The Vernonia Incident (1989)
Brain Smasher... A Love Story (1993)
Fraternity Massacre at Hell Island (2007)
Television
The Adventures of Brisco County, Jr. (1993, 1 Episode)
Murphy Brown (1993, 1 Episode)
Nurses (1994, 1 Episode)
ER (1997, 1 Episode)
Leaving L.A. (1997, 6 Episodes)
Poltergeist: The Legacy (1998, 1 Episode)
Cupid (1 Episode)
Early Edition (1998–1999, 28 Episodes)
Judging Amy (2003–2006, 1 Episode)
Love & Money (2000, 1 Episode)
Any Day Now (2001, 1 Episode)
Producer
Memphis Heat: The True Story of Memphis Wrasslin' (2010) (Post-Production)

References

External links 
 

Year of birth missing (living people)
American male film actors
American male television actors
Living people